Craig Strachan may refer to:

 Craig Strachan (hockey) (born 1971), Scottish ice hockey and field hockey player
 Craig Strachan (footballer) (born 1982), retired Scottish footballer